Underground U.S.A. is a 1980 feature-length underground film directed by Eric Mitchell and starring Patti Astor, Rene Ricard, Jackie Curtis, Cookie Mueller, Tom Wright, John Lurie, and Taylor Mead. Future director Jim Jarmusch was the sound recordist on this film.

Premise
An older woman (Astor) looks for love with younger men in a take-off of Sunset Boulevard (1950). Punk musicians kidnap Mudd Club owner Steve Mass.

See also
List of films released by New Line Cinema
No wave cinema

References

External links

1980 films
American drama films
1980s English-language films
1980s American films